Jen Cloher (born 9 October 1973) is an Australian singer, songwriter, and record producer, currently based in Melbourne, Victoria. Cloher's 2017 self-titled fourth studio album peaked at number 5 on the Australian ARIA Charts. From 2006 to 2010, Cloher recorded and toured with her band Jen Cloher and the Endless Sea and since 2013 has released with Mia Dyson and Liz Stringer music under the name Dyson Stringer Cloher.

Career
Originally from Adelaide, Cloher moved to Sydney and studied at the National Institute of Dramatic Art (NIDA). Whilst studying, Cloher lived in a share house with several musicians, which is when she bought her first second-hand guitar, and started to write songs. In 1994, Cloher graduated NIDA at the age of 21.

After NIDA, Cloher performed in Andrew Bovell's After Dinner and performed in it at the Edinburgh Festival. Upon returning to Australia, Cloher continued to pursue her music career.

In the late 1990s, Cloher colloboared with Sydney collective Bonepeople on the track "Looking for More".

In 2001, Cloher relocated to Melbourne. Later that year, she released her debut EP titled, Movement Involves Danger, on Regency Records. Cloher then released the EP Permanent Marker via Shiny Records in 2005. The single, "Rain", was played on Triple J.

In 2006, Cloher's debut album Dead Wood Falls was released. It was credited to Jen Cloher and the Endless Sea, a collective of musicians. Its lineup originally included drummer Jen Sholakis, bassist "Lord" Geoffrey Dunbar, guitarist Michael Hubbard, pianist Ross Calia and violinist Andrea Summer. Cloher herself was nominated for ARIA Award for Best Female Artist at the ARIA Music Awards of 2006.

In 2009, Cloher's mother was diagnosed with Alzheimer's and Cloher found songwriting a way of expressing herself. This led to the writing and creation of Cloher's second album, Hidden Hands. The album included the single "Eden with My Eve". Calia and Sumner were replaced by Laura Jean and Biddy Connor, respectively; Tiny Ruins guitarist Tom Healy was also added to the line-up. Following a solo tour with Jordie Lane, Cloher took an extended hiatus from music.

In 2012, Cloher re-emerged and signed with Milk! Records, a label created by Cloher's partner Courtney Barnett the same year. Cloher released a duet with former Kid Sam frontman Kieran Ryan, titled "Call If You Need Me". It was included on the EP Baby We Were Born to Die.

Cloher recorded an album at Melbourne's Headgap Studios. Her backing band included lead guitarist Barnett, bassist Bones Sloane and drummer Sholakis. In October 2012, Cloher released "Mount Beauty", the lead single from her then-yet-to-be-titled third studio album. It was released as a limited-edition split seven-inch, with the flipside containing Courtney Barnett's song "History Eraser". To support the album's release, Cloher began a crowdfunding campaign with a target of $15,000, which she exceeded. In Blood Memory was released in May 2013 and was shortlisted for the Australian Music Prize.

In August 2013 Cloher collaborated with Mia Dyson and Liz Stringer and formed Dyson Stringer Cloher. The trio released 
an EP which featured an individual track from each musician. They then took on the road, playing over 40 shows around the country.

In January 2014, Cloher won a Victorian Music Management Award.

In June 2014, Cloher released "Stone Age Brain" featuring Tim Rogers. The B-side of the CD single was a cover of The Loved Ones' "Sad Dark Eyes".

In September 2015, Cloher contributed two tracks for the Milk! Records compilation titled Good for You, released in February 2016. The album featured songs from Cloher, Courtney Barnett, The Finks, Ouch My Face, East Brunswick All Girls Choir and Fraser A. Gorman. The EP was supported with a national tour featuring all six artists.

Later that year, Dead Wood Falls was released on vinyl for the very first time in celebration of its 10-year anniversary. The release was supported by a reunion show of the original line-up of Jen Cloher and The Endless Sea in October 2016.

In August 2017, Cloher released her self-titled album. The album was preceded by the singles "Forgot Myself" and "Regional Echo" and debuted at number 5 on the ARIA charts. The album received five star reviews from The Herald Sun, The Guardian and The Independent and was voted Double J's Album of the Year for 2017. The album was shortlisted for the Australian Music Prize.

In December 2017, it was announced that Cloher would be one of the guest judges for Happy Mag's 'Needle in the Hay' vinyl competition.

In 2018, Cloher toured the United States, Europe and Australia.

In 2019, Cloher reunited with Dyson and Stringer. The trio recorded a self-titled album in eight days at The Loft in Chicago in April 2019, which was released in October 2019 and toured nationally.

In March 2023, Cloher released her fifth studio album, I Am the River, the River Is Me.

Personal life
Cloher is of Ngāpuhi and Ngāti Kahu descent through her mother.
Cloher uses she/her and they/them pronouns and identifies as Takatāpui.

Cloher was in a relationship with Courtney Barnett from 2012 to 2018. Cloher's relationship with Barnett informed much of her 2017 self-titled album. They have sung several songs together, including "Numbers", a song about their relationship and their age difference—Cloher is 14 years older.

Backing band members

Jen Cloher Band
Current members
Jen Sholakis – drums, backing vocals (2012–present)
Robert Wrigley – lead guitar (2018–present)
Nathalie Pavlovic – bass, backing vocals (2022–present)
Anika Ostendorf – keyboards, guitar, backing vocals (2022–present)

Former members
Courtney Barnett – lead guitar, backing vocals (2012–2018)
Bones Sloane – bass, backing vocals (2012–2018)
Ricky Bradbeer – bass, backing vocals (2018–2022)

The Endless Sea
Jen Sholakis – drums (2006–2010, 2016)
Michael Hubbard – lead guitar (2006–2010, 2016)
"Lord" Geoffrey Dunbar – bass (2006–2010, 2016)
Ross Calia – piano (2006–2008, 2016)
Andrea Summer – violin, backing vocals (2006–2008, 2016)
Laura Jean – piano, backing vocals (2008–2010)
Biddy Connor – violin, musical saw, backing vocals (2008–2010)
Tom Healy – guitar (2008–2010)

Discography

Studio albums

Compilations

Extended plays

Singles

Awards

AIR Awards
The Australian Independent Record Awards is an annual awards night to recognise, promote and celebrate the success of Australia's Independent Music sector.

|-
| 2006
| herself
| Most Outstanding New Independent Artist
| 
|-
| rowspan="2" | 2018
| herself
| Best Independent Artist
| 
|-
| Jen Cloher
| Best Independent Album
| 
|-
|  2020
| Dyson Stringer Cloher 
| Best Independent Blues and Roots Album or EP
| 
|-

APRA Awards
The APRA Awards are presented annually from 1982 by the Australasian Performing Right Association (APRA), "honouring composers and songwriters".

! 
|-
| 2018 
| "Forgot Myself"
| Song of the Year
| 
| 
|-

ARIA Music Awards
The ARIA Music Awards is an annual awards ceremony that recognises excellence, innovation, and achievement across all genres of Australian music. Cloher has been nominated once.

|-
| 2006
| Dead Wood Falls
| Best Female Artist
| 
|-

Australian Music Prize
The Australian Music Prize (the AMP) is an annual award of $30,000 given to an Australian band or solo artist in recognition of the merit of an album released during the year of award. The commenced in 2005.

|-
| 2013
| In Bloody Memory
| Australian Music Prize
| 
|-
| 2017
| Jen Cloher
| Australian Music Prize
| 
|-

Australian Women in Music Awards
The Australian Women in Music Awards is an annual event that celebrates outstanding women in the Australian Music Industry who have made significant and lasting contributions in their chosen field. They commenced in 2018.

|-
| 2018
| Jen Cloher
| Music Leadership Award 
|

J Awards
The J Awards are an annual series of Australian music awards that were established by the Australian Broadcasting Corporation's youth-focused radio station Triple J. They commenced in 2005.

|-
| J Awards of 2017
| herself
| Double J Artist of the Year
| 
|-

Music Victoria Awards
The Music Victoria Awards is an annual awards ceremony celebrating Victorian music. Cloher has won one award form four nominations.

|-
| 2013
| herself
| Best Female Artist
| 
|-
| 2014
| herself
| Best Female Artist
| 
|-
| rowspan="2"| 2017
| Jen Cloher
| Best Album
| 
|-
| herself
| Best Female Artist
| 
|-
| 2020
| herself
| Best Musician
| 
|-

National Live Music Awards
The National Live Music Awards (NLMAs) are a broad recognition of Australia's diverse live industry, celebrating the success of the Australian live scene. The awards commenced in 2016.

|-
| 2018
| Jen Cloher
| Live Guitarist of the Year
| 
|-

Notes

References

Australian women guitarists
Australian women singer-songwriters
Living people
Musicians from Adelaide
1973 births
Australian LGBT singers
Australian rock singers
21st-century Australian singers
21st-century Australian women singers
21st-century guitarists
21st-century women guitarists
New Zealand Māori musicians
Australian people of Māori descent